County Road 138 or County Route 138 may refer to :

County Road 138 (Columbia County, Florida), formerly State Road 138
County Road 138 (Gilchrist County, Florida), also formerly State Road 138

County Road 138 (Pinellas County, Florida), locally known as Gulfport Boulevard and 22nd Avenue South
County Route 138 (Herkimer County, New York)
County Route 138 (Niagara County, New York)
County Route 138 (Onondaga County, New York)